Park Sang-wook (born January 18, 1976) is a South Korean actor.

Filmography

Film

Television series

References

External links 
 Park Sang-wook at Namoo Actors 
 
 
 

1976 births
Living people
21st-century South Korean male actors
South Korean male television actors
South Korean male film actors
Korea University alumni
South Korean Buddhists